Glover Lucas Teixeira (born 28 October 1979) is a Brazilian-American retired mixed martial artist. He competed in the Light Heavyweight division in the Ultimate Fighting Championship (UFC), where he is a former UFC Light Heavyweight Champion. Teixeira is a former member of the Brazilian National Wrestling Team and has competed in the WEC, Impact FC, PFC and Shooto. He is the second oldest UFC champion in history behind Randy Couture and the oldest first time champion in UFC history. As of January 24, 2023, he is #5 in the UFC light heavyweight rankings.

Background
Teixeira is originally from the rural community of Sobrália, Minas Gerais, Brazil and is of Portuguese descent. There was no electricity in many of the homes in his community, and there was only one gas station. He moved to Danbury, Connecticut in 1999 to help support his family and found a job in landscaping. It was there that he met his wife, Ingrid.

After watching boxers such as Mike Tyson and the early mixed martial arts fighters such as Royce Gracie and Chuck Liddell compete, Teixeira decided that he wanted to follow the same path. He had never heard of Brazilian jiu-jitsu, but was able to find and watch videos of UFC 1 and UFC 2, which featured UFC Hall of Famer Royce Gracie.

After working 10 to 12-hour days landscaping, Teixeira did boxing training at Hat City Boxing and Brazilian jiu-jitsu at American Top Team Connecticut. John Hackleman, who had trained a fighter who fought Teixeira and was impressed by the young Brazilian, invited Teixeira to his gym in California, The Pit, where Teixeira began training with Chuck Liddell. Teixeira now trains and instructs at his own gym Teixeira MMA & Fitness in Bethel, Connecticut.

In November 2020, Teixeira became an American citizen. "I'm so proud today because I’m officially an American Citizen. Now I’m very proud to represent both Brazil & America," said Teixeira.

Mixed martial arts career
Teixeira earned his 7th Degree Hawaiian Kempo Black Belt under Hackleman, owner of The Pit Martial Arts; he earned his Brazilian Jiu-Jitsu black belt under Luigi Mondelli, head coach at American Top Team Connecticut, and earned his Vale Tudo black belt under Marco Ruas of Ruas Vale Tudo. Teixeira is also CrossFit certified.

Ultimate Fighting Championship
On 21 February 2012, it was announced that Teixeira had signed a deal with the UFC and would make his debut in early summer 2012.

Teixeira debuted in the UFC on 26 May 2012 at UFC 146, facing Kyle Kingsbury. After a quick exchange, Teixeira won by submission at 1:53 of the first round.

Teixeira was expected to face former UFC Light Heavyweight Champion Quinton Jackson on 13 October 2012 at UFC 153. However, Jackson pulled out of the bout citing an injury and was replaced by Fábio Maldonado. Teixeira dominated Maldonado throughout the fight, resulting in the doctor stopping the fight at the end of round two.

Teixeira and Quinton Jackson took place on 26 January 2013 at UFC on Fox 6. Teixeira outboxed Jackson and scored a knockdown in round 1. He also outwrestled Jackson and used his jiu-jitsu to dominate him on the ground, proceeding to a unanimous decision 30–27 (twice) and 29–28 win.

Teixeira was expected to face Ryan Bader on 25 May 2013 at UFC 160. However, Bader withdrew from the bout citing an injury and was replaced by James Te Huna. Teixeira won by submission with a guillotine choke in the first round. The performance earned Teixeira Submission of the Night honors.

The bout with Bader eventually took place on 4 September 2013 as the main event at UFC Fight Night 28. Teixeira won the fight via TKO in the first round. The win also earned Teixeira his first Knockout of the Night bonus award. With the victory, Teixeira earned an opportunity at the UFC Light Heavyweight title.

Zuffa initially announced Teixeira would face Jon Jones on 1 February 2014 at UFC 169. However, on 7 October, Dana White said the announcement for this fight on that card was premature and that Jones and Teixeira would face each other on a different card. The bout with Jones was expected to take place on 22 February 2014 at UFC 170. Jones and Teixeira eventually took place on 26 April 2014 at UFC 172. Teixeira lost the bout via unanimous decision.

Teixeira faced Phil Davis on 22 October 2014 at UFC 179. Teixeira lost the fight via unanimous decision.

Teixeira was expected to face Rashad Evans on 22 February 2015 at UFC Fight Night 61. However, on 7 January, Teixeira pulled out of the bout citing a knee injury that he had sustained in his last fight.

Teixeira was expected to face Alexander Gustafsson on 20 June 2015 at UFC Fight Night 69. However, it was announced on 1 May that Gustafsson had been removed from the card due to injury.

Teixeira faced Ovince Saint Preux on 8 August 2015 in the main event at UFC Fight Night 73. Teixeira won via submission in the third round. He was also awarded his first Fight of the Night bonus award.

Teixeira faced Patrick Cummins on 7 November 2015 at UFC Fight Night 77. He won the fight via TKO in the second round.

Teixeira faced Rashad Evans on 16 April 2016 at UFC on Fox 19. He won the fight via knockout in the first round and was awarded a Performance of the Night bonus.

Teixeira was expected to face Anthony Johnson on 23 July 2016 at UFC on Fox 20. However, Johnson pulled out of the bout to tend to personal issues. The bout was rescheduled and eventually took place at UFC 202. Johnson defeated Teixeira by knockout in the opening seconds of the fight.

Teixeira faced Jared Cannonier on 11 February 2017 at UFC 208. He won the fight by unanimous decision.

A rescheduled fight with Alexander Gustafsson took place on 28 May 2017 in the main event at UFC Fight Night 109. Teixeira lost the fight via knockout in the fifth round. Despite the loss, the bout earned Teixeira his second Fight of the Night bonus award.

Teixeira was scheduled to face Misha Cirkunov on 28 October 2017 at UFC Fight Night 119. However, the pairing was delayed after a recent hand surgery for Teixeira was slow to heal and the bout eventually took place on 16 December 2017 at UFC on Fox 26. Teixeira won the fight via TKO in the first round.

Teixeira was briefly linked to a bout with Volkan Oezdemir on 12 May 2018 at UFC 224. However, Oezdemir was pulled from that pairing in favor of a matchup with Maurício Rua at UFC Fight Night 134.

Teixeira was expected to face Ilir Latifi on 22 July 2018 at UFC Fight Night 134. However, on 5 July 2018, it was announced that Latifi was pulled from the event, citing injury. Latifi was replaced by Corey Anderson. He lost the fight via unanimous decision.

Teixeira was expected to face Jimi Manuwa on 22 September 2018 at UFC Fight Night 137. However, Teixeira suffered an injury in August and was removed from the match-up.

Teixeira was scheduled to face Ion Cuțelaba on 19 January 2019 at UFC Fight Night 143. However, on 10 January 2019, Cuțelaba was pulled out of the bout due to injury. After seeking a replacement for Cuțelaba, the UFC announced that Karl Roberson was stepping up to face Teixeira. Teixeira defeated Roberson by submission via arm triangle choke in the first round.

Teixeira eventually faced Cuțelaba at UFC Fight Night: Jacaré vs. Hermansson on April 27, 2019. He won the fight via submission via a rear-naked choke submission in the second round. The win also earned Teixeira his second Performance of the Night bonus award.

Teixeira faced Nikita Krylov on September 14, 2019 at UFC Fight Night 158. He won the back-and-forth fight via split decision.

Teixeira was originally scheduled to face Anthony Smith on April 25, 2020 at UFC Fight Night: Smith vs. Teixeira. However, on April 9, Dana White, the president of UFC announced that this event was postponed  and rescheduled to May 13, 2020 at UFC Fight Night: Smith vs. Teixeira. He won the fight via technical knockout in round five.

Teixeira was scheduled to face Thiago Santos on September 12, 2020 at UFC Fight Night 177. However, due to Teixeira testing positive for COVID-19 a week prior to the bout, the pair was rescheduled to fight on October 4, 2020 at UFC on ESPN: Holm vs. Aldana. In turn, on September 15, the bout was postponed again as Santos also tested positive for the virus. The pairing with Santos eventually took place on November 7, 2020 at UFC on ESPN: Santos vs. Teixeira. Teixeira won the fight via a submission in round three.

UFC Light Heavyweight Championship 

Teixeira was expected to face Jan Błachowicz on September 25, 2021 at UFC 266 for the UFC Light Heavyweight Championship. However, the bout was postponed and moved to October 30, 2021 at UFC 267. Teixeira won via submission due to a rear naked choke in the 2nd round, winning the UFC Light Heavyweight Championship. This win made him the oldest first time champion in UFC history at 42 years old, and also earned him the Performance of the Night award.

Teixeira was scheduled to defend his title against Jiří Procházka on May 7, 2022 at UFC 274. However, the bout was postponed on June 11 at UFC 275 for unknown reasons. After a back and forth battle, Teixeira lost the fight and title via rear-naked choke submission in the fifth round. This fight earned him the Fight of the Night award.

The rematch between Procházka  and Teixeira was scheduled on December 10, 2022, at UFC 282.  However, on November 23, Procházka pulled out due to a shoulder injury that will require surgery and at least six months of rehabilitation. He decided to vacate the title, and Teixeira subsequently refused a replacement fight against Magomed Ankalaev. Therefore, the co-main event bout between former champion Jan Błachowicz and Ankalaev was promoted to the main event status and arranged for the vacant championship.

With the title staying vacant due to a draw, Teixeira faced Jamahal Hill on January 21, 2023, at UFC 283, for the vacant UFC Light Heavyweight Championship. He lost the bout via unanimous decision after being oustruck for five rounds and announced his retirement during the post-fight interview. This fight earned him the Fight of the Night award.

Activism
In May 2013, Teixeira had prepared testimony and spoke before the Members of the Connecticut General Assembly Public Safety and Security Committee. Teixeira spoke in hopes of encouraging their vote to legalize and regulate Mixed Martial Arts in Connecticut. Teixeira ended his testimony by stating, "Having been in Connecticut since 1999, I can tell you that MMA is a very popular sport here as it is all over the world. Ironically, I can sit in my living room in Danbury and watch MMA on television. I can buy it on Pay-Per-View. I can watch it in restaurants and bars across Connecticut. I can go to Mixed Martial Arts gyms throughout the state and train to compete in MMA. And I can attend live events in nearby and at the Mohegan Sun and Foxwoods Casinos. But I cannot participate in a supervised and regulated live event here in Connecticut. In conclusion, I would just add that I would love to have the opportunity to participate in an event someday here in my home state of Connecticut."

In November 2013, Teixeira attended the UFC: Fight for the Troops 3. This event was the fourth that the UFC had hosted in cooperation with a military base to support the military. It helps raise money for the Intrepid Fallen Heroes Fund, which provides support for severely wounded military personnel and veterans and the families of military personnel lost in service. The first event reportedly raised $4 million during its three-hour broadcast.

In February 2014, Teixeira went to the United States Capital and met with Senators John McCain and Harry Reid to support the continued research of the Cleveland Clinic's Lou Ruvo Center study of brain health. This landmark study is designed to look at the effects of combat sports on the human brain of professional fighters. This will continue the commitment to athlete safety and benefit athletes from many other sports. Also in attendance was UFC fighter Jon Jones, Chairman and CEO of The UFC Lorenzo Fertitta, SpikeTV President Kevin Kay, Top Rank President Todd duBoef, & Bernard Hopkins representing Golden Boy Promotions CEO Richard Schaefer.

In October 2014, Teixeira was a part of the 'Pink Bra' tour to raise money for early detection and prevention of breast cancer and breast cancer research. Danbury was one of 10 locations for 'Barbells for Boobs' on its 10-stop nationwide tour. "This is a good cause and I love it. I've lived in Danbury for the past 15 years, and anyway I can help I'm glad to," said Teixeira.

In 2016, the New American Dream Foundation, which is the philanthropic arm of the Tribuna CT Newspaper, recognized Teixeira with the "2016 American Dream Leadership Award". “I didn’t put Danbury on the map. Danbury put me on the map. Danbury gave me the opportunity to train and become the fighter I am today,” he said in his acceptance speech.

In 2022, Teixeira visited The Cure 4 The Kids Foundation to provide toys, inspiration and smiles during the holiday season. Along with other members of the UFC, Teixeira toured the facility, signed autographs, distributed Big Shots and joined members in a jumping jack and push up contest during the meet and greet.

Championships and accomplishments

Mixed martial arts
Ultimate Fighting Championship
UFC Light Heavyweight Championship (One time)
Most finishes in UFC Light Heavyweight division history (13)
Most submissions in UFC Light Heavyweight division history (7)
Second most wins in UFC Light Heavyweight division history (16)
Most post-fight bonuses in UFC Light Heavyweight division history (10)
Most submission attempts in UFC Light Heavyweight division history (16)
Performance of the Night (Four times) vs. Rashad Evans, Ion Cuțelaba, Anthony Smith, and Jan Błachowicz
Knockout of the Night (One time) vs. Ryan Bader
Submission of the Night (One time) vs. James Te-Huna
Fight of the Night (Four times) 

Shooto
South America 220-pound Championship (One time)
Sherdog
2012 Beatdown of the Year vs. Fábio Maldonado
2012 All-Violence Second Team
2013 All-Violence Third Team
2020 Beatdown of the Year vs. Anthony Smith
2022 Fight of the Year 
BT Sport
2020 Comeback of the Year
Combat Press
2020 Comeback of the Year vs. Thiago Santos
2020 Comeback Fighter of the Year
World MMA Awards
2022 Fight of the Year vs. Jiří Procházka at UFC 275
ESPN
2022 Fight of the Year 
Cageside Press
2022 Fight of the Year 
Wrestling Observer Newsletter
2022 MMA Match of the Year

Grappling
Quintet Ultra
Team WEC 2019 grappling survival team

Mixed martial arts record

|-
|Loss
|align=center|33–9
|Jamahal Hill
|Decision (unanimous)
|UFC 283
|
|align=center|5
|align=center|5:00
||Rio de Janeiro, Brazil
|  
|-
|Loss
|align=center|33–8
|Jiří Procházka
|Submission (rear-naked choke)
|UFC 275
|
|align=center|5
|align=center|4:32
|Kallang, Singapore
|
|- 
|Win
|align=center|33–7
|Jan Błachowicz 
|Submission (rear-naked choke)
|UFC 267
|
|align=center|2
|align=center|3:02
|Abu Dhabi, United Arab Emirates
|
|-
|Win
|align=center|32–7
|Thiago Santos
|Submission (rear-naked choke)
|UFC on ESPN: Santos vs. Teixeira
|
|align=center|3
|align=center|1:49
|Las Vegas, Nevada, United States
|
|-
|Win
|align=center|31–7
|Anthony Smith
|TKO (punches)
|UFC Fight Night: Smith vs. Teixeira
|
|align=center|5
|align=center|1:04
|Jacksonville, Florida, United States
|
|-
|Win
|align=center|30–7
|Nikita Krylov
|Decision (split) 
|UFC Fight Night: Cowboy vs. Gaethje
|
|align=center|3
|align=center|5:00
|Vancouver, British Columbia, Canada
|
|-
|Win
|align=center|29–7
|Ion Cuțelaba
|Submission (rear-naked choke)
|UFC Fight Night: Jacaré vs. Hermansson
|
|align=center|2
|align=center|3:37
|Sunrise, Florida, United States
|
|-
|Win
|align=center|28–7
|Karl Roberson
|Submission (arm-triangle choke)
|UFC Fight Night: Cejudo vs. Dillashaw
|
|align=center|1
|align=center|3:21
|Brooklyn, New York, United States
|
|- 
|Loss
|align=center|27–7
|Corey Anderson
|Decision (unanimous)
|UFC Fight Night: Shogun vs. Smith
|
|align=center|3
|align=center|5:00
|Hamburg, Germany
|
|- 
|Win
|align=center|27–6
|Misha Cirkunov
|TKO (punches)
|UFC on Fox: Lawler vs. dos Anjos
|
|align=center|1
|align=center|2:45
|Winnipeg, Manitoba, Canada
|
|-
|Loss
|align=center|26–6
|Alexander Gustafsson
|KO (punches)
|UFC Fight Night: Gustafsson vs. Teixeira
|
|align=center|5
|align=center|1:07
|Stockholm, Sweden
|
|-
|Win
|align=center|26–5
|Jared Cannonier
|Decision (unanimous)
|UFC 208
|
| align=center|3
| align=center|5:00
|Brooklyn, New York, United States
|
|-
|Loss
|align=center|25–5
|Anthony Johnson
|KO (punch)
|UFC 202
|
|align=center|1
|align=center|0:13
|Las Vegas, Nevada, United States
|
|-
|Win
|align=center|25–4
|Rashad Evans
|KO (punches)
|UFC on Fox: Teixeira vs. Evans
|
|align=center|1
|align=center|1:48
|Tampa, Florida, United States
|
|- 
|Win
|align=center|24–4
|Patrick Cummins
|TKO (punches)
|UFC Fight Night: Belfort vs. Henderson 3
|
|align=center|2
|align=center|1:12
|São Paulo, Brazil
|
|-
|Win
|align=center|23–4
|Ovince Saint Preux
|Technical Submission (rear-naked choke)
|UFC Fight Night: Teixeira vs. Saint Preux
|
|align=center|3
|align=center|3:10
|Nashville, Tennessee, United States
|
|-
| Loss
| align=center|22–4
| Phil Davis
| Decision (unanimous)
| UFC 179
| 
| align=center|3
| align=center|5:00
| Rio de Janeiro, Brazil
|
|-
| Loss
| align=center|22–3
| Jon Jones
| Decision (unanimous)
| UFC 172
| 
| align=center|5
| align=center|5:00
| Baltimore, Maryland, United States
| 
|-
| Win
| align=center|22–2
| Ryan Bader
| TKO (punches)
| UFC Fight Night: Teixeira vs. Bader
| 
| align=center|1
| align=center|2:55
| Belo Horizonte, Brazil
| 
|-
| Win
| align=center|21–2
| James Te Huna
| Submission (guillotine choke)
| UFC 160
| 
| align=center|1 
| align=center|2:38
| Las Vegas, Nevada, United States
| 
|-
| Win
| align=center|20–2
| Quinton Jackson
| Decision (unanimous)
| UFC on Fox: Johnson vs. Dodson
| 
| align=center|3
| align=center|5:00
| Chicago, Illinois, United States
| 
|-
| Win
| align=center|19–2
| Fábio Maldonado
| TKO (doctor stoppage)
| UFC 153
| 
| align=center|2
| align=center|5:00
| Rio de Janeiro, Brazil
| 
|-
| Win
| align=center|18–2
| Kyle Kingsbury
| Submission (arm-triangle choke)
| UFC 146
| 
| align=center|1
| align=center|1:53
| Las Vegas, Nevada, United States
| 
|-
| Win
| align=center| 17–2
| Ricco Rodriguez
| TKO (submission to punches)
| MMA Against Dengue
| 
| align=center| 1
| align=center| 1:58
| Rio de Janeiro, Brazil
| 
|-
| Win
| align=center| 16–2
| Marvin Eastman
| KO (punch)
| Shooto Brasil: Fight for BOPE
| 
| align=center| 1
| align=center| 4:00
| Rio de Janeiro, Brazil
| 
|-
| Win
| align=center| 15–2
| Antonio Mendes
| Submission (rear-naked choke)
| Shooto Brazil 24
| 
| align=center| 1
| align=center| 4:06
| Brasília, Brazil
| 
|-
| Win
| align=center| 14–2
| Márcio Cruz
| TKO (punches)
| Fight Club 1: Brazilian Stars
| 
| align=center| 2
| align=center| 4:21
| Rio de Janeiro, Brazil
| 
|-
| Win
| align=center| 13–2
| Simão Melo da Silva
| KO (punches)
| Shooto Brazil 23	
| 
| align=center| 1
| align=center| 1:49
| Rio de Janeiro, Brazil
| 
|-
| Win
| align=center| 12–2
| Daniel Tabera
| Decision (unanimous)
| Bitetti Combat 8: 100 anos do Corinthians	
| 
| align=center| 3
| align=center| 5:00
| São Paulo, Brazil
| 
|-
| Win
| align=center| 11–2
| Marko Peselj
| TKO (punches)
| Impact FC 2 
| 
| align=center| 1
| align=center| 3:01
| Sydney, Australia
| 
|-
| Win
| align=center| 10–2
| Tiago Monaco Tosato
| TKO (punches)
| Bitetti Combat MMA 7 
| 
| align=center| 1
| align=center| 1:27
| Rio de Janeiro, Brazil
| 
|-
| Win
| align=center| 9–2
| Joaquim Ferreira
| TKO (corner stoppage)
| Bitetti Combat MMA 6 
| 
| align=center| 2
| align=center| 1:30
| Brasília, Brazil
| 
|-
| Win
| align=center| 8–2
| Leonardo Nascimento Lucio 
| Technical Submission (guillotine choke)
| Bitetti Combat MMA 4
| 
| align=center| 1
| align=center| 3:11
| Rio de Janeiro, Brazil
| 
|-
| Win
| align=center| 7–2
| Buckley Acosta
| TKO (punches)
| PFC 7: Palace Fighting Championship 7
| 
| align=center| 1
| align=center| 1:00
| Lemoore, California, United States
| 
|-
| Win
| align=center| 6–2
| Jorge Oliveira
| KO (punches)
| PFC 6: No Retreat, No Surrender
| 
| align=center| 1
| align=center| 0:05
| Lemoore, California, United States
| 
|-
| Win
| align=center| 5–2
| Rameau Thierry Sokoudjou
| KO (punches)
| WEC 24
| 
| align=center| 1
| align=center| 1:41
| Lemoore, California, United States
| 
|-
| Win
| align=center| 4–2
| Jack Morrison
| Submission (rear-naked choke)
| WEC 22
| 
| align=center| 1
| align=center| 1:27
| Lemoore, California, United States
| 
|-
| Win
| align=center| 3–2
| Carlton Jones
| TKO (punches)
| WEC 20
| 
| align=center| 1
| align=center| 1:57
| Lemoore, California, United States
| 
|-
| Loss
| align=center| 2–2
| Ed Herman
| Decision (unanimous)
| SF 9: Respect
| 
| align=center| 3
| align=center| 5:00
| Gresham, Oregon, United States
| 
|-
| Win
| align=center| 2–1
| Justin Ellison
| TKO (punches)
| SF 5: Stadium
| 
| align=center| 1
| align=center| N/A
| Gresham, Oregon, United States
| 
|-
| Win
| align=center| 1–1
| Matt Horwich
| Decision (unanimous)
| SF 3: Dome
| 
| align=center| 3
| align=center| 5:00
| Gresham, Oregon, United States
| 
|-
|  Loss
| align=center| 0–1
| Eric Schwartz
| TKO (punches and elbows)
| WEC 3
| 
| align=center| 2
| align=center| 3:33
| Lemoore, California, United States
| 
|-

Submission grappling record

|- style="text-align:center; background:#f0f0f0;"
| style="border-style:none none solid solid; "|Result
| style="border-style:none none solid solid; "|Opponent
| style="border-style:none none solid solid; "|Method
| style="border-style:none none solid solid; "|Event
| style="border-style:none none solid solid; "|Date
| style="border-style:none none solid solid; "|Round
| style="border-style:none none solid solid; "|Time
| style="border-style:none none solid solid; "|Notes
|-
|Draw|| Jake Shields || Draw || Quintet Ultra || December 12, 2019 || 1 || 8:00 ||
|-
|Loss|| Gabriel Vella || Points || ADCC Brasil trials (Over 99 kg)|| 2011|| || ||
|-
|Win|| Armando Sapo || Submission || ADCC Brasil trials (Over 99 kg)|| 2011|| || ||
|-
|Win|| Salvador Minnit || Submission || ADCC Brasil trials (Over 99 kg)|| 2011|| || ||
|-
|Win|| Jorge Bezerra || Points || ADCC Brasil trials(Over 99 kg)|| 2011|| || ||
|-
|Loss|| Vinny Magalhães ||Submission (armbar)|| ADCC Barcelona (Under 99 kg)|| 2009|| || || 
|-
|Loss|| Gerardi Rinaldi || Points || ADCC Barcelona (Under 99 kg)|| 2009|| || || 
|-
|Win|| Dean Lister || Points || ADCC Barcelona (Under 99 kg)|| 2009|| || || 
|-
|Win|| Vesa Vuori || Points || ADCC Barcelona (Under 99 kg)|| 2009|| || || 
|-
|Win|| Leonardo Chocolate || Submission (rear-naked choke) || ADCC Brasil trails (Under 99 kg)|| 2009|| || || 
|-
|Win|| Renato Ferreira || Points || ADCC Brasil trails (Under 99 kg)|| 2009|| || || 
|-

Main event bouts

Pay-per-view bouts

See also
 List of male mixed martial artists

References

External links
 

 Teixeira MMA & Fitness

1979 births
Living people
Brazilian male mixed martial artists
Light heavyweight mixed martial artists
Heavyweight mixed martial artists
Brazilian practitioners of Brazilian jiu-jitsu
People awarded a black belt in Brazilian jiu-jitsu
Brazilian male karateka
Brazilian kajukenbo practitioners
Brazilian expatriate sportspeople in the United States
Mixed martial artists from Connecticut
Mixed martial arts training facilities
Brazilian jiu-jitsu trainers
Martial arts trainers
Mixed martial arts trainers
Mixed martial arts people
Brazilian male boxers
Sportspeople from Minas Gerais
Brazilian martial artists
Muay Thai trainers
Brazilian emigrants to the United States
Martial arts school founders
Ultimate Fighting Championship male fighters
Submission grapplers
Sports academies
Bethel, Connecticut
Danbury, Connecticut
Brazilian male kickboxers
Mixed martial artists utilizing boxing
Mixed martial artists utilizing Brazilian jiu-jitsu
Mixed martial artists utilizing kajukenbo
Mixed martial artists utilizing karate
Ultimate Fighting Championship champions